Smalley is a civil parish in the Amber Valley district of Derbyshire, England.  The parish contains seven listed buildings that are recorded in the National Heritage List for England.  Of these, one is listed at Grade II*, the middle of the three grades, and the others are at Grade II, the lowest grade.  The parish contains the village of Smalley and the surrounding area, and the listed buildings consist of two large houses and associated structures, and a church.


Key

Buildings

References

Citations

Sources

 

Lists of listed buildings in Derbyshire